The following is a list of notable alumni of The New School for Jazz and Contemporary Music. Members of this list have attended for at least one semester and are  notable in their respective field in the music industry.

* Designates did not complete degree/diploma program.

List

Thana Alexa
Joe Ascione
Marcus Baylor
Kenyatta Beasley
Miri Ben-Ari
Peter Bernstein
Bilal
Walter Blanding, Jr.
Andy Boehmke
Dekel Bor
Otis Brown III
Avishai Cohen
Aaron Comess
Adam Cruz
Jesse Davis
Mike Effenberger
John Ellis
James Francies
Rebecca Coupe Franks
Robert Glasper
Larry Goldings
Assaf Hakimi
Roy Hargrove
Owen Howard
Ali Jackson
José James
Greg Kurstin
Steve Lyman
Dave Masucci
Brad Mehldau
Mike Moreno
Mike Rodriguez
Jaz Sawyer
Becca Stevens
Loren Stillman
E. J. Strickland
Marcus Strickland
Alex Skolnick
Taali
Yuki Tei
J.J. Wright
 Wallice*

Notes

References

The New School alumni